Timorense Liga Pre is the second division of the Federaçao Futebol Timor-Leste. This competition is a qualification for Super Liga Timorense, the first division. The competition was replaced by Liga Futebol Amadora Segunda Divisão.

Format
This competition format using the system home tournament, divided into 2 (two) groups consisting of 4-5 clubs each.

Winners
2005-15: not played

References

2
Sports leagues established in 2004
2004 establishments in East Timor
East